Leonard Edward Moore (born November 25, 1933) is an American former professional football player who played both halfback and flanker in the National Football League (NFL) for the Baltimore Colts from 1956 to 1967. He played college football for Penn State Nittany Lions. He was named the NFL Rookie of the Year in 1956 and was selected to the Pro Bowl seven times.  Moore was inducted into the Pro Football Hall of Fame in 1975.

Early years
Moore was born in Reading, Pennsylvania, and was blessed with exceptional athletic ability. He attended Reading High School, where his speed on the field earned him the nickname "The Reading Rocket." He was tagged with a number of other nicknames: "Sputnik," for the fear he incited in opposing defenses; "The Reading Rambler" and "Lightning Lenny," for his unmatched speed; and "Spats," for the way he taped his high-top shoes, making them look like low-tops, and one of the first to expose tapings outside the shoes.

College
Moore leveraged his speed and ability into a college athletic scholarship and entered Pennsylvania State University in the fall of 1952 as the first individual in his family to attend college. In an era before freshmen were allowed to play in games and "redshirt" status did not exist, he achieved great success, scoring 24 touchdowns in 27 games in just three seasons on the varsity with the Nittany Lions.  Moore left the school as their all-time leader in 100-rushing yard games (12), rushing yards (2,380), all-purpose yards (3,543), and single-season all-purpose yards (1,486 in 1954).

NFL

Moore's achievements at Penn State did not go unnoticed by scouts from the NFL, and he was drafted by the Colts in the first round of 1956 with the ninth pick.

Moore was both a great runner and receiver, lining up in the backfield as a halfback and split wide as a flanker, and was equally dangerous at both positions in the Colts' offense run by quarterback Johnny Unitas. Moore averaged at least seven yards per carry in three seasons, and has a career average of 4.8 yards per carry. He had 40 receptions for 687 yards and seven touchdowns in 1957, the first of five years in which he would have 40 or more catches. In an era of pounding running games, Moore was a glimpse of things to come in the NFL, with a career average of 30 receptions per year out of the backfield.

During his rookie season in 1956, Moore established himself as one of the most well-rounded runners and receivers in the league, and won the NFL Rookie of the Year award. In 1958, he caught a career-high 50 passes for 938 yards and seven touchdowns in helping the Colts win the NFL championship. In 1959, Moore had 47 receptions for 846 yards and six touchdowns as the Colts repeated as champions.

Moore was injured in 1962, a knee injury, and lost his starting job in 1963 from the knee injury. In 1964, he had one of his best statistical seasons when he scored 20 touchdowns, helping to lead the Colts to a 12–2 regular-season record and a trip to the NFL Championship Game for the third time in seven seasons. He was voted by his fellow players as the Most Valuable Player, a remarkable award considering he played most of the season with complications from appendicitis, and gave credence to the claim that he was one of the toughest players in the NFL. He also won Comeback Player of the Year Award in 1964.

Moore scored a touchdown in an NFL-record 18 consecutive appearances starting in 1963 and continuing through the entire 1964 season, ending in 1965. This record stood for 40 years until being equaled by LaDainian Tomlinson in 2005.  Because his streak was interrupted by a five-game absence due to injury in 1963, he does not hold the NFL's official record for consecutive games rushing for a touchdown.

Race and football
Moore faced the difficult task of being an African American in the NFL during the 1950s and 1960s. Most teams averaged about six African American players on their roster during his time in the league. His race also came into question after his retirement in 1968 when he was not given a long-term contract with CBS Television, ending his attempt to be the first black sports broadcaster for CBS.

Moore occasionally speaks to student groups about his experiences as a black football player during an era when, in the words of Baltimore Sun sportswriter Rick Maese, "Moore could travel with his teammates but couldn't always eat in the same restaurant, couldn't always stay at the same hotel, couldn't always fraternize with them the same way out of the locker room as he had in it."

"There was never anybody ever closer than me and the guys that I played football with on that Baltimore team – on the field," Moore told the Sun. "We were just like glue. One for all, all for one." But "once they blew the whistle and the game was over, they (the white players) went their way, we (the black players) went our way. We split. It was race."

Fellow NFL player Ollie Matson mentored Moore and warned him that "'they're going to call you the big N. You're going to hear it all. So don't get yourself all worked up, because it's going to happen.'"

Legacy
Moore retired from professional football after the 1967 season. In 12 seasons and 143 regular-season games he scored 111 total touchdowns, accumulated 11,213 total yards, made seven Pro Bowls, and five all-NFL teams. His uniform number 24 was retired by Baltimore, and in 1969 a sportswriters' poll named him to the NFL's 50th Anniversary Team.

In 1975 Moore was elected to the Pro Football Hall of Fame, and was named to the NFL's 1950s All Decade Team.  In 1999, The Sporting News''' ranked Moore 71st on its list of the 100 Greatest Football Players. He is the only player in NFL history to have at least 40 receiving touchdowns and 40 rushing touchdowns.

Football Outsiders, in their book Pro Football Prospectus 2007'', named six of his seasons among the top 500 running back seasons of all time, which was tied for the 5th most seasons among the top 500 of any player.  Moore's retired number is honored along with all of the other Baltimore Colts retired numbers in M&T Bank Stadium in Baltimore, home of the Baltimore Ravens.

On January 19, 2008, Moore was inducted into the East-West Shrine Game Hall of Fame class.  Moore was an honorary captain for Penn State's game versus Syracuse on September 12, 2009. It was the first time a former Penn State player has been invited to participate in the pre-game coin toss.  Moore is a member of The Pigskin Club of Washington, D.C. National Intercollegiate All-American Football Players Honor Roll.

Moore retired in 2010 from the Maryland Department of Juvenile Services after 26 years of service. His job with the state included traveling to middle and high schools, mixing and mingling with at-risk children, trying to keep them straight. He was a keynote speaker for churches, organizations and youth groups, teaching children and adults about the risks of drugs and he worked to improve the lives of troubled teens.

On October 8, 2013, Moore had a road in Baltimore County named after him in his honor.

Moore's charity work includes raising money for the fight against scleroderma. He holds an annual benefit dinner in memory of his son Leslie, who died at 43 of that disease.

References

Further reading

External links
 
 

1933 births
Living people
Sportspeople from Reading, Pennsylvania
Players of American football from Pennsylvania
African-American players of American football
American football halfbacks
Penn State Nittany Lions football players
Baltimore Colts players
National Football League Offensive Rookie of the Year Award winners
Western Conference Pro Bowl players
Pro Football Hall of Fame inductees
National Football League announcers
21st-century African-American people
20th-century African-American sportspeople
National Football League players with retired numbers